Thirupathi is a 2006 Indian Tamil-language masala film written and directed by Perarasu and produced by AVM Productions. The film stars Ajith Kumar, C. Arun Pandian and Sadha, with Riyaz Khan and others appearing in other pivotal roles. The film released on 14 April 2006. It garnered mixed reviews from critics, but was a hit at the box office.

Plot 
Thirupathi is a straightforward young man who leads a happy life with his parents and younger sister. He happens to meet Priya, and they fall in love. Thirupathi's sister is pregnant, and at the time of delivery, he takes her to a hospital. The doctor there expects a bribe, but when it is not forthcoming, he neglects his duty; therefore, Thirupathi's sister dies. Thirupathi learns that this is not the first instance in the hospital, and the doctor is his best friend Soori's brother. When Thirupathi goes out to get Soori's brother, Soori and his father do all that they can to protect him from Thirupathi. How Thirupathi gets his revenge on the people responsible for his sister's death forms the rest of the movie.

Cast 

 Ajith Kumar as Thirupathi
 Sadha as Priya
 Riyaz Khan as Soori
 Arun Pandian as ACP Murali
 Sampath Raj as Soori's brother
 Pyramid Natarajan as Minister
 Livingston as Chanakkiyan
 R. Sundarrajan as Thirupathi's father
 Rajalakshmi as Thirupathi's mother
 Harish Raghavendra as Thirupathi's brother
 Deepu as Thirupathi's sister
 Sathyan as Thirupathi's friend
 Ganja Karuppu as Muthu
 M. S. Baskar as P. A. Brahma
 Anu Mohan as Temple Priest
 Aarthi as Priya's friend
 Vidharth as Henchman
 Manobala
 Rajesh
 Bala Singh
 Suvarna Mathew
 Thalapathy Dinesh
 Benjamin as Thirupathi's friend
 Perarasu in a cameo appearance
 Laila as a dancer in Song ("Keerai Vedhaippom")

Production 

During the making of Sivakasi, representatives from AVM Productions approached Perarasu to make a commercial film with Ajith Kumar in the lead role. The director immediately accepted the offer and told the producer the story of the film during the meeting and the film was announced publicly two days later. In August 2005, it became clear that the film would begin in November and that Riyaz Khan would play the lead antagonist role in the project. Sadha was signed on to play the lead female role. The film was launched officially on 15 September 2005 with Vijay attending the opening ceremony.

For the film, Ajith lost 18 kilograms in 55 days by being on a liquid diet and lost the weight he had sported on screen in his previous few films. The art director erected the set of a village in Prasad Studios in December 2005 including a shopping place, a big temple and an 80 ft statue of Lord Shiva. In early 2006, Asin was approached to appear in an item number in the film but refused, with Laila eventually taking the role.

Soundtrack

Release 
The satellite rights of the film were sold to Kalaignar TV.

Critical reception 
The film received mixed reviews from the critics and audiences. Many drew comparisons to Perarasu's previous works, Thirupachi and Sivakasi.

References

External links 
 

2000s Tamil-language films
2006 films
Films directed by Perarasu
Films set in Chennai
Indian action films
2000s masala films
Medical-themed films
Films scored by Bharadwaj (composer)